The cubic metre (in Commonwealth English and international spelling as used by the International Bureau of Weights and Measures) or cubic meter (in American English) is the unit of volume in the International System of Units (SI). Its symbol is m3. It is the volume of a cube with edges one metre in length.  An alternative name, which allowed a different usage with metric prefixes, was the stère, still sometimes used for dry measure (for instance, in reference to wood). Another alternative name, no longer widely used, was the kilolitre.

Conversions

{|
|-
|rowspan=6 valign=top|1 cubic metre 
|=  litres (exactly)
|-
|≈ 35.3 cubic feet
|-
|≈ 1.31 cubic yards
|-
|≈ 6.29 oil barrels
|-
|≈ 220 imperial gallons
|-
|≈ 264 US fluid gallons
|}

At 0 °C, the freezing point of water, a cubic metre of water has slightly less mass, 999.972 kilograms.

The "cubic metre" symbol is encoded by Unicode at code point .

Multiples and submultiples

Multiples 
Cubic decametre
the volume of a cube of side length one decametre (10 m)
equal to a megalitre
1 dam3 =  = 1 ML

Cubic hectometre
the volume of a cube of side length one hectometre (100 m)
equal to a gigalitre
in civil engineering abbreviated MCM for million cubic metres
1 hm3 =  = 1 GL
 
Cubic kilometre
the volume of a cube of side length one kilometre
equal to a teralitre
1 km3 =  = 1 TL (810713.19 acre-feet; 0.239913 cubic miles)

Submultiples 
Cubic decimetre
the volume of a cube of side length one decimetre (0.1 m)
equal to a litre
1 dm3 = 0.001 m3 = 1 L
 (also known as DCM (=Deci Cubic Meter) in Rubber compound processing)

Cubic centimetre
the volume of a cube of side length one centimetre (0.01 m)
equal to a millilitre
1 cm3 =  = 10−6 m3 = 1 mL

Cubic millimetre
the volume of a cube of side length one millimetre (0.001 m)
equal to a microlitre
1 mm3 =  = 10−9 m3 = 1 μL

Notes

Orders of magnitude (volume)
Units of volume
SI derived units